The Coal Creek Patrol Cabin in Glacier National Park, Montana, is a rustic backcountry log cabin. Built in 1925, the cabin has a single room with a board floor and a small cellar for a food cache. The cabin was used by rangers on patrol routes from the Nyack and Paola ranger stations.

The cabin is notable for its original roof construction, which consisted of peeled logs laid along the pitch of the roof, culminating in a log ridgepole.  The added weight was borne by double log purlins, one on top of the other.  The configuration was apparently intended to protect against deadfalls, falling trees or branches. The logs were replaced by shingles in the 1940s and by metal in the 1960s. While the Paola ranger station was abandoned in 1932, as well as the Nyack station, the Coal Creek cabin is maintained and used by trail maintenance crews.

References

Ranger stations in Glacier National Park (U.S.)
Park buildings and structures on the National Register of Historic Places in Montana
Houses completed in 1925
Government buildings completed in 1925
Log cabins in the United States
National Register of Historic Places in Flathead County, Montana
Log buildings and structures on the National Register of Historic Places in Montana
1925 establishments in Montana
National Register of Historic Places in Glacier National Park
National Park Service rustic in Montana